This is a list of albums and singles recorded by American musician Joan Osborne.

Albums

Studio albums

Compilation albums

Live albums

Deluxe editions

Albums with Trigger Hippy

Singles

Notes
A ^ "I've Got to Use My Imagination" peaked at number 27 on the US Billboard Jazz Songs chart.

References

Discographies of American artists